Kaire is a unisex given name.

Female
Kaire Kaljurand (born 1974), Estonian footballer
Kaire Kimsen (born 1978), Estonian footballer
Kaire Leibak (born 1988), Estonian triple jumper
Kaire Nõmm (born 1971), Estonian architect
Kaire Vilgats (born 1976), Estonian singer and actress

Male
Kaire Mbuende (born 1953), Namibian politician and diplomat

Estonian feminine given names